The 1980 United States presidential election in Alaska took place on November 4, 1980, as part of the nationwide presidential election. Voters chose three representatives, or electors, to the Electoral College, who voted for president and vice president.

Alaska was won by Ronald Reagan (R–California) with 54.3% of the popular vote against incumbent President Jimmy Carter (D–Georgia) with 26.4%. This is the worst performance by the Democratic Party in Alaska in U.S. history. Reagan ultimately won the national vote, defeating Carter and becoming the next President. Alaska has only voted Democratic once, and that was in 1964 for Lyndon B. Johnson.

Libertarian candidate Ed Clark had his strongest showing in Alaska and set the record for the best performance of a Libertarian presidential candidate on a statewide level.  He also beat Independent candidate John B. Anderson in this state despite Anderson winning more votes than Clark nationally.

Results

See also
United States presidential elections in Alaska

References

1980 Alaska elections
Alaska
1980